Sound Reporting: The NPR Guide to Audio Journalism and Production is a 2008 book by Jonathan Kern published by the University of Chicago. It concerns National Public Radio.

Background
At the time of publication the author was employed by NPR as a trainer; he previously worked as All Things Considered's executive producer.

Contents
Rob Quicke of William Paterson University stated that the book's coverage extends to all "[aspects] of audio production and journalism". The book has eighteen chapters and 382 pages total. The initial portion has five chapters: "Sound & Stories," "Fairness," "Writing for Broadcast," "Reporting," and "Field of Producing." The latter part includes chapters about the directing, editing, and production processes and making commentary. The final chapter discusses changes in the radio process due to the introduction of digital technology.

Quicke wrote that the book was written in a way so that people who are interested in media organizations other than NPR would find value in the book.

The book contains a glossary.

Reception
Donna Seaman of Booklist wrote that the book is "Comprehensive and lucid".

Quicke stated that he "highly recommended" the book.

References

External links
 Excerpt at University of Chicago Press website.

2008 non-fiction books
NPR
University of Chicago Press books